Rachelle Dinet Hutchinson (born December 9, 1971) is an American politician. A member of the Democratic Party, she serves in the Georgia House of Representatives from the 107th District, taking office in January 2019.

Early life 
Shelly Hutchinson was born in New Orleans, Louisiana. Hutchinson was raised as a Catholic. She received her bachelor's degree in Criminal Justice from Louisiana State University and her Master's Degree in Social Work from the University of Georgia.

Personal life 
Hutchinson moved to Gwinnett County in 1995 and currently resides there. She worked for the Fulton County Division of Family and Child Services before she started her own small business, The Social Empowerment Center.

Political career

Campaigns 
In 2018, Hutchinson ran for an open Georgia House of Representative seat in House District 107. During the campaign, she was one of a handful of state legislature candidates in Georgia to be endorsed by former President Barack Obama. She defeated Ken Montano in the Democratic primary and went on to defeat Republican Janet Mihoci in the 2018 midterm general election. Hutchinson is the first member of the Democratic Party to win the district since Nikki Randal in 2002.

References

External links 

21st-century American politicians
21st-century American women politicians
Democratic Party members of the Georgia House of Representatives
Living people
Women state legislators in Georgia (U.S. state)
1971 births